Sheikh Rashid bin Saeed Crossing, also known as Sixth Crossing, was reported  as  a future bridge in Dubai, United Arab Emirates. The bridge's overall length will be . The bridge, designed by FXFOWLE Architects, with lighting by AWA Lighting Designers, will cost AED 2.5 billion. It will be a part of a AED 3 billion roads project near The Lagoons. The bridge is expected to be complete in 2015.

The bridge will link the localities of Al Jaddaf and Bur Dubai. It will have six lanes of traffic in each direction and will be able to carry 20,000 vehicles per hour.  In the center will be a track for Dubai Metro's Green Line.

See also
List of bridges and tunnels in Dubai
List of longest arch bridge spans

References

External links
 Bridge description at FXFOWLE Architects webpage

Bridges in Dubai
Proposed bridges in Asia
Through arch bridges